Mary Teresa Goulding (born 24 August 1996) is a New Zealand professional basketball player.

Early life and career
Goulding attended Rangiora High School in Rangiora, New Zealand, and played in the Women's Basketball Championship (WBC) for the Canterbury Wildcats in 2014 and 2015. In 2018, she returned to the Wildcats for a one-game stint.

College career
In 2015, Goulding began her college career for the Gillette Pronghorns in Gillette, Wyoming, participating in the NJCAA. After her first year, Goulding would then go on to play Division I basketball with the Fordham Rams in Bronx, New York. During her senior year, Goulding was named team captain of the Rams and A-10 Championship Most Outstanding Player.

Professional career
In 2019, Goulding played for the Rockhampton Cyclones in the Queensland Basketball League.

For the 2019–20 season, Goulding moved to Sweden to play for IK Eos Lund of the Basketligan dam.

In 2020, Goulding played for the Bendigo Spirit during the WNBL Hub season in Queensland.

In 2021, Goulding played for the East Perth Eagles of the NBL1 West. She was the league's leading rebounder and earned All-NBL1 West First Team honours.

For the 2021–22 WNBL season, Goulding returned to the Bendigo Spirit.

In 2022, Goulding joined the Mainland Pouākai for the inaugural season of the Tauihi Basketball Aotearoa.

National team career
In 2021, Goulding represented the New Zealand Tall Ferns at the FIBA Asia Cup.

References

1996 births
Living people
Bendigo Spirit players
College women's basketball players in the United States
Fordham University alumni
Forwards (basketball)
New Zealand expatriate basketball people in the United States
New Zealand women's basketball players
Tauihi Basketball Aotearoa players